Munditia manawatawhia is a minute sea snail, a marine gastropod mollusc in the family Liotiidae.

Description
The height of the smooth shell attains 0.8 mm, its diameter 1.5 mm. This very small, white shell has a discoidal shape and wide umbilicus. It contains 2½ rapidly increasing whorls. The aperture is circular.

Distribution
This marine species is endemic to New Zealand. It is known from the Three Kings Islands, New Zealand.

References

 

manawatawhia
Gastropods of New Zealand
Gastropods described in 1937